The list of richest Indians by net worth based on an annual assessment of wealth and assets compiled and published by Forbes magazine. As of Jan 2023, India has 166 billionaires which put the country third in the world, after the United States and China. Mukesh Ambani the chairman and largest shareholder of Reliance Industries, has been the richest Indian for 13 consecutive years. He is currently world's 10th richest person in the world according to Forbes. Savitri Jindal is currently India's richest woman topping the list at 7th position.

Top 25 richest Indians 
The table below lists India's richest people as per their net worth published by the Forbes (2023).

Source: Forbes

Top 5 richest Indian women 

Source: Forbes India

See also 

 Forbes list of billionaires
 List of countries by the number of billionaires
 List of wealthiest families

References

People by net worth
New worth
Indian
Economy of India lists